Light Miniature Aircraft was an American aircraft manufacturer based in Okeechobee, Florida. The company specialized in the design of ultralight aircraft and supplied plans for amateur construction.

The company seems to have gone out of business about 2010, but Wicks Aircraft continues to provide kits for the designs.

Products
The company's LM-1, 2 and 3 family of aircraft were designed in the mid-1980s during the initial ultralight boom. At the time many pilots did not find the typical early "flying lawnchair" ultralights confidence inspiring or appealing. The company's designs were intended to fit the same FAR Part 103 rules, including its  empty weight, but provide aircraft that look and fly like a traditional light aircraft. However, many of the designs result in completed aircraft that are heavier than the US ultralight rule empty weight limit.
 
The LM-1 family of designs are built from wood, or optionally 4130 steel tube and finished with doped aircraft fabric covering. The completion involves minor changes in the cowling, window and tail shapes to make them resemble well-known light aircraft designs. The first in the series, the LM-1 is a single seat 75-85% scale replica of a Piper J-3 Cub and was first flown in 1985. The LM-2 is a single or two seat 75% scale replica of a Taylorcraft B, while the LM-3 is a single seat 75% scale replica of an Aeronca Champ. The follow-on Light Miniature Aircraft LM-5 is a full-sized tandem two-seat replica of the Piper PA-18 Super Cub.

The LM-J3-W is a full-sized two-seat J-3 Cub replica, while the LM-TC-W is a full-sized two-seats in side-by-side configuration Taylorcraft replica, both rendered in wood and fabric.

Aircraft

References

External links
 - previous location
Company website archives on Archive.org

 
Defunct aircraft manufacturers of the United States
Ultralight aircraft
Homebuilt aircraft